This list of electoral wards in Merthyr Tydfil County Borough includes county borough electoral wards in Merthyr Tydfil County Borough, Wales. It also includes Community Council wards.

County Borough Wards pre-1974
Prior to 1 April 1974 the electoral wards to Merthyr Tydfil County Borough Council were Cyfarthfa, Dowlais, Park, Penydarren, Plymouth, Town and Treharris.

County Borough Wards
The post-1996 county borough is divided into 11 electoral wards returning 33 councillors to Merthyr Tydfil County Borough Council. Most of these wards are coterminous with communities (parishes) of the same name.  The following table lists council wards, numbers of councillors, associated communities and geographical areas:

c = Ward coterminous with community of the same name

Community wards
Bedlinog is the only community in Merthyr Tydfil County Borough to elect a community council. For elections to Bedlinog Community Council, four community councillors are elected from a Bedlinog ward and five are elected from a Trelewis ward.

See also
 List of electoral wards in Mid Glamorgan
 List of electoral wards in Wales

References

Merthyr Tydfil